Ceratosanthes is a genus of flowering plants belonging to the family Cucurbitaceae.

Its native range is Tropical America.

Species:

Ceratosanthes angustiloba 
Ceratosanthes cuneata 
Ceratosanthes hilariana 
Ceratosanthes humilis 
Ceratosanthes multiloba 
Ceratosanthes palmata 
Ceratosanthes parviflora 
Ceratosanthes rupicola 
Ceratosanthes tomentosa 
Ceratosanthes trifoliata 
Ceratosanthes warmingii

References

Cucurbitaceae
Cucurbitaceae genera